The 1988 United States presidential election in Minnesota took place on November 8, 1988, as part of the 1988 United States presidential election. Voters chose ten representatives, or electors to the Electoral College, who voted for president and vice president.

Minnesota was won by Democrat Michael Dukakis, Governor of Massachusetts, with 52.91% of the popular vote over Republican Vice President George H. W. Bush's 45.90%, a victory margin of 7.01%. This made Minnesota roughly 14.8% more Democratic than the nation-at-large.

Four years earlier Minnesota had been the only state in the entire country to vote for Democrat Walter Mondale over Republican Ronald Reagan, and this Democratic strength in the state endured in 1988, as Minnesota chose Michael Dukakis by a comfortable margin despite George H.W. Bush winning a convincing victory nationwide. Minnesota has the longest streak of voting Democratic of any state, having not voted Republican since 1972.

As of the 2020 U.S. presidential election, this is the last time Minnesota voted to the right of neighboring Iowa, as well as the last time in which Clay County voted for a losing presidential candidate.

Results

Results by county

See also
 United States presidential elections in Minnesota

References

Minnesota
1988
1988 Minnesota elections